Group A of the Adriatic League took place between 4 October 2017 and it ended on 21 December 2017.

The four best ranked teams advanced to the League 8.

Standings

Fixtures and results
All times given below are in Central European Time (for the matches played in Bulgaria is time expressed in Eastern European Time, for the matches played in Turkey is time expressed in Further-eastern European Time).

Game 1

Game 2

Game 3

Game 4

Game 5

Game 6

Game 7

Game 8

Game 9

Game 10

References

External links
Official website

Group A